This article concerns the period 119 BC – 110 BC.

References